A partial lunar eclipse took place on Monday, August 17, 1970, the second of two lunar eclipses in 1970, the first was on February 21 of that year. The Earth's shadow on the Moon was clearly visible in this eclipse, with 41% of the Moon in shadow; the partial eclipse lasted for 2 hours and 11 minutes. It was the second of two lunar eclipses in 1970. Occurring only 3 hours and 14 minutes before perigee (Perigee on the same day), the Moon's apparent diameter was 6.3% larger than average.

More details about the Partial Lunar Eclipse of 17 August 1970.
Penumbral Magnitude: 1.35215

Umbral Magnitude: 0.40797

Gamma: -0.80534

Date: Monday, 17 August 1970

Saros Series: 118th (49 of 73)

Greatest Eclipse: 1970 August 17 at 03:23:25.6 UTC

Sun Right Ascension: 9.74

Sun Declination: 13.6

Sun Diameter: 1895.8 arc-seconds

Moon Right Ascension: 21.77

Moon Declination: -14.3

Moon Diameter: 2007.8 arc-seconds

The total duration of the eclipse was 4 hours, 31 minutes.

The duration of the partial eclipse was 2 hours, 11 minutes.

Visibility
This partial lunar eclipse was visible over the Americas, Europe and Africa, seen rising over the Pacific and setting over Africa.

Relation to other lunar eclipses

Lunar year series

Metonic cycle
This is the third of five Metonic lunar eclipses.

Half-Saros cycle
A lunar eclipse will be preceded and followed by solar eclipses by 9 years and 5.5 days (a half saros). This lunar eclipse is related to two annular solar eclipses of Solar Saros 125.

See also
List of lunar eclipses
List of 20th-century lunar eclipses

Notes

External links

1970-08
1970 in science
August 1970 events